Izza Kizza (born Terry Davis in 1981) is an American hip hop recording artist and MC, currently signed to Timbaland's Mosley Music Group label. He is known for creating mixes with an eclectic flow and versatile style, recalling some of hip-hop's most playful moments.

Biography

Born and raised in Valdosta, Georgia, Terry started performing at the age of twelve in a singing group that consisted of his older brother and his two godbrothers. Later, influenced by appearance of emerging acts such as Kris Kross, he started his own career as an MC, adopting the stage name of Izza Kizza and gaining a significant local following. This brought him to the attention of the production duo Soul Diggaz. Following their invite, he relocated to New Jersey in order to further his music career. There he collaborated with renowned hip-hop artists such as Missy Elliott (resulting in the song "Walk The Dawg", which samples singer Shirley Ellis' "The Clapping Song"), and ultimately accepted the offer to sign for Timbaland's record label, Mosley Music/Interscope Records.  He has since left Timbaland's MMG citing that Timbaland was too busy with his solo album, Shock Value II, and didn't want to wait for him to finish with his other obligations.  They are still friends.

Izza's first mixtape, "Kizzaland", mixed by Nick Catchdubs, was made available as a free download in 2008 via his weblog, sporting mixes by Timbaland, Soul Diggaz and Koolade. One of the songs from the mixtape, "Red Wine", was featured as the opening track of Paste Magazine's June 2008 New-Music Sampler CD. The song "Millionaire" was included in the soundtrack for the Madden NFL 09 video game, as well as his song "They're Everywhere" being included on the NBA 2K10 video game soundtrack.

"They're Everywhere" also appeared on the 5th season of the popular FOX dance competition So You Think You Can Dance in a hip-hop routine danced by 4th-place finisher Kayla Radomski and 7th-place finisher Jason Glover, it was choreographed by Shane Sparks.

Discography

Albums
2008: Kizzaland (mixtape)
2009: The Wizard of Iz (mixtape)
2010: 10:15 (mixtape)

Compilation appearancesThe New Deal, 2008 – presented by 10 Deep, mixed by DJ Benzi; contributed "Back To Miami" (prod. Koolade)

As featured artist
2007: "Happy Birthday" presented by So Def and Missy Elliott
2008: "Murder" presented by Ashlee Simpson on her album Bittersweet World2009: "Worst Day" presented by Calvin Harris on his album Ready for the Weekend2009: "What Up Y'all" presented by Crookers on his album Tons of Friends2011: "Fucked Up" presented by Ultraviolet Sound on their album Ultraviolet Sound''
2015: "Bruh" Presented by Jordyn Jones

External links
 Official site
 An interview with Izza Kizza conducted in May 2009

References

Living people
African-American rappers
1981 births
21st-century American rappers
21st-century African-American musicians
20th-century African-American people